= Braton Hollow =

Valley in Jackson County, Oregon, United States

Coordinates: 42°33′37″N 123°03′14″W

Braton Hollow is a valley in the U.S. state of Oregon.

Braton Hollow was named in 1885 after one Darlin Brayton.
